This is an overview of the  of the Eocene Messel Formation as explored by the Messel Pit excavations in Germany. A former quarry and UNESCO World Heritage Site, the Messel Formation preserves what once were a series of lakes surrounded by sub-tropical rainforest during the Middle Eocene, approximately 47 Ma.

Several major monographs on the paleoflora have been published since the early 1900s, with  producing the first leaf monograph in 1922, followed by Heidemarie Thiele-Pfeiffer in 1988 who provided the first in-depth palynological revision and expansion. Most recently Margaret Collinson, Steven Manchester, and Volker Wilde collaborated to study and redescribe the flowers, fruits, seeds, and other reproductive organs of the formation, with the monograph being published in 2011.

Dinoflagellates
Only a single dinoflagellate taxon has been described formally from the Messel formation.  Based on the predominance in layers where heavy nearshore runoff or slippage is present, its suggested Messelodinium thielepfeifferae was likely an inhabitant of warm nearshore waters in the adult stage or wind and wave action resulted in large accumulation of the cysts. M. thielepfeifferae populations are most prevalent in the older layers of the lake, when it was suggested to be holomictic and become absent in the youngest layers when green algae become dominant with the lake shifting to meromictic conditions and the water chemistry changed.

Charophyta
Olaf Lenz et al (2011) briefly noted the presence of the Zygnemataceae fossil genus Ovoidites, but only gave general population densities with no enumeration on species information.

Chlorophyta
Several chlorophyte green algae are identified from the Messel Formation, with the greatest concentrations being found in the youngest layers. In the older layers Tetraedron minimum is a distinct component of the yearly varves in the lake, with large blooms occurring to form the lighter summer portions of the varve couplets. In the younger layers, Botryococcus species become the most prolific, having taken over as a major phytoplankton taxon from T. minimum and the dinoflagellate Messelodinium thielepfeifferae.

Pteridophytes

Conifers

Basal angiosperms

Nymphaeales

Magnoliids

Laurales

Magnoliales

Monocots

Alismatales

Arecales

Liliales

Pandanales

Poales

Basal eudicots

Proteales

Ranunculales

Superasterids

Campanulids

Cornales

Ericales

Lamiids

Superrosids

Fabids

Malvids

Myrtales

Saxifragales

Vitaceae

Incertae sedis
Carpolitus is a plant morphogenus circumscribed for fossil fruits and seeds that are distinct but not identifiable to defined taxa. Collinson, Manchester, & Wilde (2012) described but did not name 63 distinct Carpolithus morphotypes from the Messel Formation.

Pollen and spores
The first foray into Messel palynology was produced by H. D. Pflug (1952) with follow-up papers in 1957 and coauthored with P. Thomas in 1953. The pollen and spore record was revised and expanded by Heidemarie Thiele-Pfeiffer (1988) who provided the largest in depth palynological work focusing exclusively on the Messel Formation.

Pteridophyte spores

Lycophyte spores

Conifer pollens

Basal angiosperm pollens

Chloranthalean pollens

Magnoliid pollens

Monocot pollens

Alismatalean pollens

Arecalean  pollens

Commelinid pollens

Superasterid pollens

Campanulid pollens

Cornalean pollens

Ericalean pollens

Lamiid pollens

Santalalean pollens

Superrosid pollens

Fabid pollens

Malvid pollens

Myrtalean pollens

Incertae sedis pollens

References

Eocene life
Natural history of Germany
Messel Formation
Messel Formation
Messel Formation